Fred Joseph Bedenk (July 14, 1897 – May 2, 1978) was an American football and baseball player and coach. He served as the head baseball coach at Rice University from 1925 to 1926 and at Pennsylvania State University from 1931 to 1962. Bedenk was also the head football coach at Penn State for one season in 1949, tallying a mark of 5–4.

Playing career
Bedenk played guard for the Penn State Nittany Lions football team. He was elected team captain and earned All-America honors in 1923. He graduated from Penn State with a Bachelor of Arts in finance in 1924.

Coaching career
Bedenk served for several years as Penn state's line coach before being promoted to head coach for the 1949 season. After finishing the year at 5–4, Bedenk requested a return to coaching the line and the university brought in Rip Engle as head coach, and Engle's quarterback from Brown University, Joe Paterno as an assistant coach.

Death
Bedenk died on May 2, 1978, at the Mountainview Unit of Centre Community Hospital—now known as Mount Nittany Medical Center—in State College, Pennsylvania, following a long illness.

Head coaching record

Football

References

1897 births
1978 deaths
American football guards
Florida Gators football coaches
Penn State Nittany Lions baseball coaches
Penn State Nittany Lions baseball players
Penn State Nittany Lions football coaches
Penn State Nittany Lions football players
Rice Owls baseball coaches
Rice Owls football coaches
Mansfield University of Pennsylvania alumni
Sportspeople from Williamsport, Pennsylvania
Players of American football from Pennsylvania